The European Poker Tour (EPT) is a series of poker tournaments similar to those in the World Poker Tour (WPT), created by John Duthie, winner of the inaugural Poker Million tournament. It began in 2004 as part of the worldwide explosion in Texas Hold 'em popularity. Since 2011 the EPT has been sponsored and wholly owned and controlled by PokerStars the online casino and taped by Sunset + Vine for television broadcast across Europe.

In seasons 1-3, the most significant difference between the competing poker tours was the buy-in and its effect on the prize pool, with the EPT featuring buy-ins about half the size of the WPT. This changed in season 4 when the buy-in for most EPT events was increased to €8,000 (due to increased popularity and lack of space in participating casinos). At 2007 exchange rates, this is approximately equal to the US$10,000 which is the buy-in for most WPT events.

Furthermore, the final table is made up of 8 players, as opposed to the 6 player final tables popularised by the WPT.

For the first couple of seasons, Duthie commentated for the show alongside Colin Murray. Since the middle of Season 3, James Hartigan has been the lead commentator, with professional players Greg Raymer, Daniel Negreanu and Victoria Coren Mitchell providing analysis.  Hartigan also presents the live webcast from each event.  The TV show was first hosted by Caroline Flack, then joined by Natalie Pinkham. Seasons 4 and 5 were hosted by Kara Scott, while Seasons 6 and 7 were fronted by Michelle Orpe. Since Season 8, there have been four different presenters with Kristy Arnett, Sarah Grant, Laura Cornelius and Lynn Gilmartin, with commentators James Hartigan and Joe Stapleton presenting the TV shows.

2010 EPT Berlin robbery
On 6 March 2010 four masked men, armed with knives and at least one hand gun robbed the EPT event in Berlin. According to the police, the robbers got away with €242,000. No one was seriously injured, only one guard got a minor cut while trying to detain one of the robbers. The panic which gripped the crowd was briefly captured on the live webcast before the camera cut away. The attackers were caught several days after the robbery and later convicted and sentenced to three years in prison.

2017 rebranding
In 2017, the series was discontinued and rebranded as the PokerStars Championship. However, this only lasted one year and the EPT returned in 2018.

2020 EPT Online
In 2020, three scheduled stops on the EPT (in Monte Carlo, Barcelona and Prague) were cancelled due to the COVID-19 pandemic – a fourth event (in Sochi) continued as planned.

An inaugural EPT Online series took place on sponsor site PokerStars instead, running from 8–18 November 2020. The series comprised 20 tournaments, including a $5,200 Main Event, four $10,300 High Roller events, and a $25,000 Super High Roller. The Main Event, which had a $5 million guaranteed prize pool, attracted 1,304 entries. The final prize pool came to $6.52 million, of which $1,019,082 went to the eventual winner "WhatIfGod", with Timothy Adams finishing as runner-up.

EPT Main Event winners

References

External links
 Official site
 EPT Main Events All Time Money List

 
2005 television series debuts
Poker tournaments